"Fallait Pas Écraser La Queue Du Chat" (English:Should not crush thé cat's tail) is a song written by Jean-Yves Gaillac and interpreted by the French pop singer, Clothilde. The musical genre is Yé-yé and released in 1967. The song was successful in Europe, especially in France, Spain and the UK.

References 

1967 songs
French styles of music
1967 singles
Disques Vogue singles